Geranium pusillum, commonly known as small-flowered crane's-bill or (in North America) small geranium, is a herbaceous annual plant of the genus Geranium.

Small geranium is native to Europe but is introduced in almost every region of the USA and Canada, where it is associated with ecologically disturbed sites.

References

External links
Jepson Manual Treatment
Photo gallery

pusillum
Flora of the United Kingdom
Plants described in 1759
Taxa named by Carl Linnaeus